Rudds Gully is a locality  south-southeast of Geraldton, Western Australia. Its local government area is the City of Greater Geraldton.

References

Suburbs of Geraldton